Kastri (Kastríon) is a town in Thesprotia, Epirus, Greece. The local church is dedicated to Saint George.

Kastri is regarded as a place mainly inhabited by an Orthodox Albanian-speaking community. During the Axis occupation of Greece, 18 residents of Kastri were executed by German forces and local Cham Albanian collaborators.

Sources 

Populated places in Thesprotia
Albanian communities in Greece